David Dodd Hand (January 23, 1900 – October 11, 1986) was an American animator and animation filmmaker known for his work at Walt Disney Productions. He worked on numerous Disney shorts during the 1930s and eventually became supervising director on the animated features Snow White and the Seven Dwarfs and Bambi.

Biography 
Born in Plainfield, New Jersey, Hand began his animation career working on Max Fleischer's Out of the Inkwell cartoons throughout the 1920s. He joined the Disney studio in 1930 during a major drive by Disney to recruit from the best of animating talent.

Hand immediately made his mark as an animator. By 1932 he was regarded as one of the studio's top animators (despite some complaints that his work was "too mechanical") and had become a close friend of Disney himself. Hand's organizational skills made Disney select him to be the studio's third director after Burt Gillett and Wilfred Jackson. He made his directorial debut for the company with the Mickey Mouse short Building a Building and went on to direct both Silly Symphony and Mickey Mouse shorts, including The Flying Mouse, Who Killed Cock Robin?, Three Orphan Kittens, and Thru the Mirror. By the late 1930s Hand's management skills had allowed him to ascend the hierarchy of the Studio to functioning as Disney's right-hand man. But as historian Michael Barrier notes "Hand's position was fundamentally untenable—he was second in command in an organization whose leader, younger than Hand himself, had no intention of ever stepping aside or sharing real power."

Gaumont British Animation 
After leaving Disney in 1944, Hand went to England, and, with the backing of J. Arthur Rank, established Gaumont British Animation at Moor Hall in 1946 to produce a series called Animaland  and another called Musical Paintbox. In 1948, he produced a few theatrical animated advertisements entitled Ye Old English Car-Tunes on Esso. These were unable to get distribution in the United States, and the studio closed in 1950, dooming plans to produce two animated features adapted from H. G. Wells' The First Men in the Moon and Lewis Carroll's The Hunting of the Snark. Hand moved to Colorado where he worked for the next 18 years at the Alexander Film Company, a maker of commercials and industrial films.

Beginning in January 1949, Hand's Animaland and Musical Paintbox series were released in theaters in the United Kingdom. Later that June, both of his series were released in theaters in Canada. Few in number, Hand's shorts were shown in theaters for only a year, ending their run in the United Kingdom in July 1950 and in Canada in October 1950.

During the mid-1970s and into the early 1980s, Hand's cartoons begin airing on television for the first time in the United Kingdom. He died in California at age 86.
 
Hand's son David Hale Hand has formed David Hand Productions which owns the rights to the 19 Gaumont animated shorts -- nine Animaland cartoons and ten Musical Paintbox cartoons -- and hopes to produce new films starring some of the characters in the shorts, e.g. Ginger Nutt. In 1994, Hand was inducted into the Disney Legends program.

Filmography 
 Midnight in a Toy Shop (1930)
 The China Plate (1931)
 Egyptian Melodies (1931)
 Old King Cole (1933)
 Birds in the Spring (1933)
 The Mad Doctor (1933)
 Building a Building (1933)
 The Flying Mouse (1934)
 The Dognapper (1934)
 Mickey's Steam Roller (1934)
 Who Killed Cock Robin? (1935)
 Pluto's Judgement Day (1935)
 The Robber Kitten (1935)
 Three Orphan Kittens (1935)
 Mickey's Polo Team (1936)
 Thru the Mirror (1936)
 Three Blind Mouseketeers (1936)
  Mother Pluto (1936)
 Three Little Wolves (1936)
 Little Hiawatha (1937)
 Magician Mickey (1937)
Snow White and the Seven Dwarfs (Supervising director; 1937)
 The Whalers (1938)
 Fantasia (Associate producer; 1940)
 Bambi (Supervising director; 1942)
 Victory Through Air Power (Animation supervisor; 1943)

Animaland 
David Hand served as producer on all 9 shorts in this series.

 The Lion (Felis Leo) (1948)
 The House-Cat (Felis Vulgaris) (1948)
 The Cuckoo (1948)
 The Ostrich (1949)
 The Australian Platypus (1949)
 It's a Lovely Day (1949)
 Ginger Nutt's Bee-Bother (1949) 
 Ginger Nutt's Christmas Circus (1949)
 Ginger Nutt's Forest Dragon (1950)

Musical Paintbox 
David Hand served as producer on all 10 shorts in this series.

 Wales (1948)
 The Thames (1948)
 Somerset (1949)
 A Fantasy on Ireland (1949)
 Yorkshire Ditty (1949)
 Sketches of Scotland (1949)
 Cornwall (1949)
 Canterbury Road (1949)
 Devon Whey (1950)
 A Fantasy on London Life (1950)

References

External links 
 
 memoir of Gaumont British Animation
 David Hand's Disney Legends bio
 Animaland Model Sheets – The Cuckoo
 David Hand Productions

1900 births
1986 deaths
American animated film directors
Animators from New Jersey
Directors of Best Animated Short Academy Award winners
Film directors from New Jersey
Walt Disney Animation Studios people
People from Plainfield, New Jersey